Quercus lobbii is an uncommon species of tree in the beech family Fagaceae. It has been found in northeastern India and southwestern China (Yunnan Province). It is placed in subgenus Cerris, section Cyclobalanopsis.

Quercus lobbii is a tree up to 10 meters tall. Leaves can be as much as 7 cm long.

References

External links
line drawing, Flora of China Illustrations vol. 4, fig. 385, drawings 6-8 at lower right

lobbii
Flora of Yunnan
Flora of Assam (region)
Flora of Bangladesh
Plants described in 1883